Colonel Johnson Harris (not to be confused with Cyrus Harris of the Chickasaw Nation) (April 19, 1856 – 1921) was a native American politician. His father was White and his mother was Cherokee. Harris' public life began with his election to the Cherokee senate in 1881. On the death of J. B. Mayes, he was appointed by council as Principal Chief of the Cherokee Nation in Indian Territory, from 1891 to 1895.

References

 

1856 births
1921 deaths
Principal Chiefs of the Cherokee Nation (1794–1907)